"The Emperor's New Clothes" is a Danish fairy tale written by Hans Christian Andersen, first published in 1837.

The Emperor's New Clothes may also refer to:

Films
The Emperor's New Clothes (1961 film), a Croatian fantasy directed by Ante Babaja
The Emperor's New Clothes (1966 film), an American short film written and directed by Bob Clark
The Emperor's New Clothes (1972 TV special), a Rankin/Bass program starring Danny Kaye
The Emperor's New Clothes (1987 film), a 1987 musical comedy adaptation of the fairy tale starring Sid Caesar, part of the Cannon Movie Tales series
The Emperor's New Clothes (1991 film), an Australian animated film produced by Burbank Animation Studios
The Emperor's New Clothes (2001 film), a British drama starring Ian Holm as Napoleon Bonaparte 
The Emperor's New Clothes (2015 film), a documentary by Michael Winterbottom and Russell Brand

Music
Albums
 The Emperor's New Clothes, a 2007 album by Klute

Songs
 "The Emperor's New Clothes", a song by Every Time I Die from their 2000 EP The Burial Plot Bidding War
 "The Emperor's New Clothes", a song by Vince Gill
 "The Emperor's New Clothes", a song by Elton John from his 2001 album Songs from the West Coast
 "The Emperor's New Clothes", a song by Sinéad O'Connor from her 1990 album I Do Not Want What I Haven't Got
 "Emperor's New Clothes" (song), by Panic! at the Disco from their 2016 album Death of a Bachelor
 "Emperor's New Clothes", a song by Poison from their 2002 album Hollyweird

See also
The Emperor Wears No Clothes